The 30th Cavalry Squadron, 2nd Infantry Division, Queen Sirikit's Guard (ม.พัน.๓๐.พล.ร.๒ รอ.) is an King's Guard Mechanized infantry and Armour Squadron of the Royal Thai Army, it is currently a part of the 2nd Infantry Division, Queen Sirikit's Guard.

History
In 1978 the 30th Cavalry Squadron is 5th Armoured Reconnaissance Company. In 1983 transition from the 5th Armoured Reconnaissance Company to the Cavalry Reconnaissance Squadron. In 1989 Royal Thai Army established the 30th Cavalry Squadron, Queen's Guard.

Mission
Patrol and support infantry unit.

Weapons
 FV101 Scorpion - Reconnaissance vehicle
 M113 - Armoured personnel carrier
 M106 mortar carrier - Mortar carrier
 Humvee - Military light utility vehicle

See also
 1st Division (Thailand)
 2nd Infantry Division (Thailand)
 7th Infantry Division (Thailand)
 9th Infantry Division (Thailand)
 4th Tank Battalion, King's Guard (Thailand)
 King's Guard (Thailand)
 Royal Thai Army
 Thai Royal Guards parade

References

External links

King's Guard units of Thailand
Military units and formations established in 1989